Caryocolum stramentella is a moth of the family Gelechiidae. It is found in Italy and Turkey, Syria, Jordan and Russia.

The wingspan is about 5 mm. The forewings are mottled brown with irregular transverse cream fasciae. The dorsal margin is darker. Adults have been recorded on wing in the second half of September in Turkey and in August in Italy.

References

Moths described in 1935
stramentella
Moths of Europe
Moths of Asia